Info Myanmar University (abbreviated IMU) is a private university in Yangon, Myanmar. Info Myanmar College (IMC), the computing arm of IMCS Co., Ltd. which achieved the success in the International ICT courses and vocational trainings since 2007, was established in 2014 with the strong commitment to firmly pillar the educational requirements of the age of knowledge-based society through transforming digital economy in Myanmar. IMC was promoted to Info Myanmar University (IMU) in 2019. IMU offers the  Higher National Certificate In Computing,  Higher National Diploma In Computing  and B.Sc(Hons) in Computing programs in partnership with Edinburgh Napier University since 2017.

History 
IMCS was founded by Daw Nu Nu Thant in 2007 as a vocational training center. And then in 2014, as the computing arm of IMCS Co., Ltd., IMC was established as a Pearson Accredited Center. In 2019, IMC was promoted to IMU (Info Myanmar University). In 2017, IMC was partnered with a government University of United Kingdom, Edinburgh Napier University. Info Myanmar University, IMU, currently offers B.Sc (Hons) in Computing, M.Sc ( Advanced Security & Digital Forensics) Programs in partnership with Edinburgh Napier University, UK.

Campuses 
The University is based at its main campuses near Pyay Rd, Kamayut Township, Yangon, Myanmar (Burma).

External links 
IMU Official Website

References

Universities and colleges in Yangon
Universities and colleges in Myanmar